The 2015 Mississippi gubernatorial election took place on November 3, 2015, to elect the Governor of Mississippi. Incumbent Republican Governor Phil Bryant ran for re-election to a second and final term in office. This is the highest percentage that a Republican has ever won in a gubernatorial election in Mississippi.

The election gained national news coverage and attention due to the unexpected Democratic nominee selection of truck driver and former firefighter, Robert Gray, who had not had any political experience prior to his candidacy.

Background
Mississippi is one of nine states and territories that has lifetime limits of two terms for its governor. In 2011, with incumbent Republican Governor Haley Barbour term-limited, Republican Lieutenant Governor Phil Bryant was elected to succeed him. Bryant won the Republican primary with 59% of the vote and then defeated the Democratic nominee, Hattiesburg Mayor Johnny DuPree, with 61% of the vote.

Republican primary

Candidates

Declared
Phil Bryant, incumbent Governor
 Mitch Young

Declined
 Chris McDaniel, state senator and candidate for the U.S. Senate in 2014
 Michael Watson, state senator

Result

Democratic primary

Candidates

Declared
 Robert Gray, truck driver and retired firefighter
 Valerie Short, physician
 Vicki Slater, attorney

Declined
 Travis Childers, former U.S. Representative and nominee for the U.S. Senate in 2014
 Jim Hood, Attorney General of Mississippi (running for re-election)
 Bill Luckett, Mayor of Clarksdale and candidate for governor in 2011
 Dick Molpus, former Secretary of State of Mississippi and nominee for governor in 1995
 Brandon Presley, Commissioner for the Northern District of the Mississippi Public Service Commission and former Mayor of Nettleton (running for re-election)

Result

Reform Party nomination

Candidate
Shawn O'Hara, perennial candidate

General election

Predictions

Polling

Result

References

External links
Campaign websites (archived)
 Phil Bryant (R)
 Robert Gray (D)
 Valerie Short (D)
 Vicki Slater (D)

2015
2015 United States gubernatorial elections
November 2015 events in the United States
Gubernatorial